Nallamilli is a village in Amalapuram Mandal, Dr. B.R. Ambedkar Konaseema district in the state of Andhra Pradesh in India.

Geography 

Demographics 
As of the 2011 India census, Nallamilli had a population of 1996, out of which 1041 were male and 955 were female. The population of children below 6 years of age was 8%. The literacy rate of the village was 74%.

References 

Villages in Amalapuram Mandal